

References for new members 2021